Italy 1990 (also known as World Class Soccer in the United States and Italia 1990 in most of Europe) is a soccer video game published by U.S. Gold and programmed by Tiertex Design Studios in 1990. It features the 1990 FIFA World Cup held in Italy but is not part of the official FIFA World Cup series. For the American market it was branded as World Class Soccer. In Europe (except the U.K.) it was released as Italia 1990 by U.S. Gold in association with Erbe Software. It was released for Amiga, Amstrad CPC, Atari ST, Commodore 64, ZX Spectrum and DOS.

U.S. Gold had released the official game of the previous World Cup in 1986 (World Cup Carnival) which was extremely badly received, and would go on to release World Cup USA '94 as the official game of the 1994 World Cup. The official 1990 World Cup licence was acquired by Virgin Mastertronic who produced two titles, World Cup Soccer: Italia '90 for home computers and World Cup Italia '90 for Sega consoles.

Reception
Computer Gaming World criticised the game for only displaying about 10% of the field at a time without a "radar" screen to show the rest, but liked the animation. The magazine concluded that "World Class Soccer should prove an informative and reasonably entertaining way to prepare for the event".

See also
World Cup Italia '90
Italy '90 Soccer
Italia 1990

References

External links
 
 Review and screenshots in Spanish (archived)
 Review at Stadium 64
 Game at GiantBomb

1990 video games
Association football video games
Amiga games
Amstrad CPC games
Atari ST games
Commodore 64 games
DOS games
ZX Spectrum games
Tiertex Design Studios games
FIFA World Cup video games
1990 FIFA World Cup
Video games developed in the United Kingdom
U.S. Gold games